A pastoral practice refers to how an idea is applied or is used when giving spiritual care or guidance. That usually occurs in "pastoral ministry" and pastoral care when leading somebody closer to God either in spiritual formation, teaching, counseling, or in liturgy. In liturgy, the pastoral practice can refer to an occasional event such as blessing fathers on Father's Day. It can also refer to an ongoing structure in the liturgy such as Mass in the local language or turning the altar so that the officiant faces the congregation. In the second case, the practice would refer to a habitual or customary action or way of doing something.

Spiritual practice